is a former professional volleyball player and former coach of Hisamitsu Springs. She led Japan to a bronze medal at the 1984 Summer Olympics while still in high school and, despite serious and chronic knee injuries, remained one of the world's top setters until her retirement from the sport in 1993. Unusually for a Japanese athlete, Nakada was (and still is) remembered by opponents and teammates alike for her volatile temper, fiery competitiveness, and outspoken manner both on and off the court. After brief stints as a fashion model and motivational speaker, Nakada currently provides colour commentary and makes guest appearances in a wide range of sports and variety media in Japan. She is represented by the sportsbiz in Tokyo.

In October 2016, Nakada became the Japan women's national volleyball team's head coach and she retired from the duty in August 2021, after led the team finished the 10th place in 2020 Summer Olympics.

National team
 1982: 4th place in the World Championship
 1984: 3rd place in the Olympic Games of Los Angeles
 1986: 7th place in the World Championship
 1988: 4th place in the Olympic Games of Seoul
 1992: 5th place in the Olympic Games of Barcelona

References

External links
 Biography
 
 

1965 births
Living people
Volleyball players at the 1984 Summer Olympics
Volleyball players at the 1988 Summer Olympics
Volleyball players at the 1992 Summer Olympics
Olympic volleyball players of Japan
Olympic bronze medalists for Japan
Japanese women's volleyball players
Olympic medalists in volleyball
Asian Games medalists in volleyball
Volleyball players at the 1982 Asian Games
Volleyball players at the 1986 Asian Games
Medalists at the 1984 Summer Olympics
Medalists at the 1982 Asian Games
Medalists at the 1986 Asian Games
Asian Games silver medalists for Japan